Agtaa may refer to:

Ati language  of Panay
Magahat language  of Negros